Jean-Baptiste Charles Claudot (1733–1805), a French painter of landscapes, flowers, and still-life, was born in Badonviller (Vosges). Several of his works are in the Museum of Nancy, where he died. He was a student of Girardet and a friend of Joseph Vernet.

His painting showcased landscapes and ancient ruins.

References
 

1733 births
1805 deaths
People from Meurthe-et-Moselle
18th-century French painters
French male painters
19th-century French painters
French still life painters
19th-century French male artists
18th-century French male artists